Baghban (Gardener) is a 1938 Hindi/Urdu family drama film directed by A. R. Kardar. The story was by Begum Ansari with script and screenplay by Kardar. Film's music was composed by Mushtaq Hussain with lyrics by Mirza Shauq. The cast included Nandrekar, Bimla Kumari, Nazir, Sitara Devi, K. N. Singh, Wasti and Ashraf Khan.

Baghban was the first film directed by Kardar following his return to Bombay after directing films for East India Company in Calcutta. It became a big box-office success for him. According to Rajadhyaksha and Willemen, Kardar's interest with the topic of "sexually deviant behaviour" and violence in the garb of "reformism", a theme which he would later also use in Pagal (1940) and Pooja (1940) is present in Baghban.

The film involved a love story with a mystery. The naive Saroop falls in love with the Jail warden's daughter who is to marry someone else. He then finds out that she's his child-bride.

Plot
Saroop (Nandrekar) is a young innocent man who gets lost in romantic thoughts when he hears a Sadhu singing a love-song (prayer) to God. The holy man asks him to attend the Janamasthami fair. Through circumstances beyond his control he gets arrested for loitering and is put in jail. He is made to work in the garden area of the warden's house, where he meets Durga (Bimla Kumari), the warden's daughter. A prison riot occurs and Saroop is injured. He is brought into the house by Durga and her friend Shanta (Sitara Devi). The attending doctor is Shanta's father, Doctor Hansraj. Saroop is freed from jail, and over several meetings Durga and Saroop fall in love. However, Durga's marriage gets fixed with Ranjit (K. N. Singh) and Saroop is helpless. Ranjit has spurned his old flame Kammo (Yasmin), who is angry at the rebuff. Durga had been married off as a child, but it is believed that her boy-groom is dead. Ranjit has spread stories of her being a child-widow, in order to be the only one willing enough to marry her. On the day of the marriage, Kammo shoots Ranjit, and the Sadhu informs Dr. Hansraj that Saroop is his long-lost son who was married to Durga. Finally, Durga and Saroop get together again.

Cast
 Bimala Kumari as Durga
 B. Nandrekar as Saroop
 Sitara Devi as Shanta
 Nazir
 K. N. Singh as Ranjit
 Yasmin as Kammo
 Putlibai
 Ashraf Khan as the Sadhu (holy man)
 Ram Avtar
 Lala Yakub
 Wasti
 Mirza Mushraff

Reception

Baburao Patel, editor of the cine-magazine Filmindia, termed Bimla Kumari's acting as "staginess". Nandrekar was stated to be "useless", while Nazir's acting was cited as "unnatural and affected". K. N. Singh and Sitara Devi were the only two actors praised for their performances, with a special commendation for Singh that he would make a "good character actor". The direction for this "weak story" was called "unimaginative and unintelligent" but better than Kardar's earlier film Milap. K. N. Singh made a big name after his role in this film, he was praised by Ghosh for playing it with "remarkable assurance".

Baghban was a "tremendous success" at the box-office.

Controversy
The film ran into a controversy, described as "A storm in a tea-cup" by Baburao Patel. Nandrekar, who had acted in Amar Jyoti (1936) was contracted by Prabhat Film Company for three years. He had not obtained permission from Prabhat to work in General Films Ltd.'s Baghban. The matter reached the High Court of Bombay on 14 July 1938 for an injunction to be passed to prevent the release of the film on 18 July 1938. However, the Hon. Justice Engineer, threw out the injunction and dismissed the motion.

Soundtrack
Nine of the movie's songs were written and performed by Mirza Musharraf and the rest by Mushtaq Hussein with lyrics by Mirza Shauq and Mirza Musharraf, Hafiz Jalandhari. The singers were Sitara Devi, Ashraf Khan, Vimla, Sharda Pandit.

Songlist

References

External links
 

1938 films
1930s Hindi-language films
Films directed by A. R. Kardar
Indian drama films
Indian black-and-white films
1938 drama films
Hindi-language drama films